Michigan's 16th Senate district is one of 38 districts in the Michigan Senate. The 16th district was created by the 1850 Michigan Constitution, as the 1835 constitution only permitted a maximum of eight senate districts. It has been represented by Republican Joe Bellino since 2023, succeeding fellow Republican Mike Shirkey.

Geography
District 16 encompasses parts of Hillsdale, Lenawee, and Monroe counties.

2011 Apportionment Plan
District 16, as dictated by the 2011 Apportionment Plan, covered Branch, Hillsdale, and Jackson Counties, including the communities of Jackson, Michigan Center, Vandercook Lake, Hillsdale, Jonesville, Coldwater, Bronson, Summit Township, Blackman Township, and Leoni Township.

The district was located entirely within Michigan's 7th congressional district, and overlapped with the 58th, 64th, and 65th districts of the Michigan House of Representatives. It bordered the states of Indiana and Ohio.

List of senators

Recent election results

2018

2014

Federal and statewide results in District 16

Historical district boundaries

References 

16
Branch County, Michigan
Hillsdale County, Michigan
Jackson County, Michigan